Woodruff House may refer to:

In the United States:

William Woodruff House, Little Rock, Arkansas
S.H. Woodruff Residence, Los Angeles, California, a Los Angeles Historic-Cultural Monument in Hollywood, California
Woodruff House (Southington, Connecticut)
Ezekiel Woodruff House, Southington, Connecticut
Capt. Samuel Woodruff House, Southington, Connecticut
Jotham Woodruff House, Southington, Connecticut
Urbana Woodruff House, Southington, Connecticut
Stanley-Woodruff-Allen House, West Hartford, Connecticut
Ernest Woodruff House, Columbus, Georgia, listed on the National Register of Historic Places (NRHP) in Muscogee County, Georgia
Henry Lindsay Woodruff House, Columbus, Georgia, listed on the NRHP in Muscogee County, Georgia
Henry Lindsay Woodruff Second House, Columbus, Georgia, listed on the NRHP in Muscogee County, Georgia
Cowles–Woodruff House, Macon, Georgia
Woodruff House (Hillside, New Jersey)
Woodruff House (Cornwall, New York)
William H. Woodruff House, Green Township, Hocking County, Ohio, listed on the NRHP in Hocking County, Ohio
Charles Woodruff House (Wyoming, Ohio)
Asahel Hart Woodruff House, Salt Lake City, Utah, listed on the NRHP in Salt Lake City, Utah
Woodruff Villa, Salt Lake City, Utah, listed on the NRHP in Salt Lake City, Utah
Wilford Woodruff Farm House, Salt Lake City, Utah, listed on the NRHP in Salt Lake City, Utah, and
Woodruff-Riter House, Salt Lake City, Utah, listed on the NRHP in Salt Lake City, Utah
Woodruff Stake House, Woodruff, Utah
Jacob Woodruff House, Ripon, Wisconsin

See also
Charles Woodruff House (disambiguation)